Gold(III) chloride, traditionally called auric chloride, is a compound of gold and chlorine with the molecular formula . The "III" in the name indicates that the gold has an oxidation state of +3, typical for many gold compounds. Gold(III) chloride is hygroscopic and decomposes in visible light. This compound has few uses, although it catalyzes various organic reactions.

Structure
 exists as a chloride-bridged dimer both as a solid and vapour, at least at low temperatures. Gold(III) bromide behaves analogously. The structure is similar to that of iodine(III) chloride.

Each gold center is square planar in gold(III) chloride, which is typical of a metal complex with a d8 electron count.

Preparation
Gold(III) chloride is most often prepared by passing chlorine gas over gold powder at : 

The chlorination reaction can be conducted in the presence of tetrabutylammonium chloride, the product being the lipophilic salt tetrabutylammonium tetrachloraurate.

Another method of preparation is via chloroauric acid, which is obtained by first dissolving the gold powder in aqua regia to give chloroauric acid:

The resulting chloroauric acid is subsequently heated to give :

Reactions

On contact with water,  forms acidic hydrates and the conjugate base . An  ion may reduce it, causing elemental gold to be precipitated from the solution.

 (>160 °C)
 (>420 °C)
 is a lewis acid and readily forms complexes. For example, it reacts with hydrochloric acid to form chloroauric acid:

Chloroauric acid is the product formed when gold dissolves in aqua regia.

Other chloride sources, such as KCl, also convert  into . If gently heated,  decomposes to gold(III) oxide, and then to gold metal.

Gold(III) chloride is the starting point for the chemical synthesis of many other gold compounds. For example, the reaction with potassium cyanide produces the water-soluble complex, :

Gold(III) chloride reacts with benzene (and a variety of other arenes) under mild conditions (reaction times of a few minutes at room temperature) to produce the dimeric phenylgold(III) dichloride:

Applications

Organic synthesis
  although no transformations have been commercialised. Gold(III) salts, especially , provide an alternative to mercury(II) salts as catalysts for reactions involving alkynes. An illustrative reaction is the hydration of terminal alkynes to produce acetyl compounds.

Gold catalyses the alkylation of certain aromatic rings and the conversion of furans to phenols. Some alkynes undergo amination in the presence of gold(III) catalysts. For example, a mixture of acetonitrile and gold(III) chloride catalyses the alkylation of 2-methylfuran by methyl vinyl ketone at the 5-position:

The efficiency of this organogold reaction is noteworthy because both the furan and the ketone are sensitive to side reactions such as polymerisation under acidic conditions. In some cases where alkynes are present, phenols sometimes form (Ts is an abbreviation for tosyl):

This reaction involves a rearrangement that gives a new aromatic ring.

Production of gold nanoparticles
Gold(III) chloride is used in producing gold nanoparticles. Gold nanoparticles can be formed by the reaction of gold(III) chloride and sodium tetrafluoroborate and then coating with didodecyldimethylammonium bromide. Then washing with 1-dodecanethiol and ethanol proved to be the most effective method for forming nanoparticles. However, other methods work such as replacing the 1-dodecanethiol with dioctyl sulfide. The gold(III) chloride is the source of gold in this production.

References

External links

Chlorides
Metal halides
Gold(III) compounds
Deliquescent substances
Photographic chemicals
Gold–halogen compounds